Burkholderia oklahomensis is a gram-negative, catalase and oxidase-positive aerobic, motile bacterium from the genus of Burkholderia and the family of Burkholderiaceae which was isolated 1973 from a wound infection caused by a farming accident in Oklahoma in the United States. Burkholderia oklahomensis is a bacterium which has been described in association with melioidosis. Colonies of Burkholderia oklahomensis are white colored.

References

External links
Type strain of Burkholderia oklahomensis at BacDive -  the Bacterial Diversity Metadatabase

Burkholderiaceae
Bacteria described in 2006